Denys Vyacheslavovich Kildiy (born 7 October 2004) is a  Ukrainian professional footballer who plays as a midfielder.

Career

FC Chernihiv
Kildiy is a product of FC Chernihiv. In summer 2021 he moved from the academy to the senior squad and made his debut against Karpaty Halych in the Ukrainian Second League. On 31 August 2021 he made his debut in the Ukrainian Cup against Alliance Lypova Dolyna at the Chernihiv Arena in Chernihiv, replacing Bohdan Lytvynenko in the 83rd minute. On 19 August 2022 he left the club.

Career statistics

Club

References

External links
 
 

2004 births
Living people
Footballers from Chernihiv
Ukrainian footballers
Association football midfielders
FC Chernihiv players
FC Yunist Chernihiv players
Ukrainian Second League players
Ukrainian expatriate footballers
Expatriate footballers in Lithuania
Ukrainian expatriate sportspeople in Lithuania